Hans Heibach (1 December 1918 – 6 March 1970) was a German international footballer.

References

1918 births
1970 deaths
Association football midfielders
German footballers
Germany international footballers
Fortuna Düsseldorf players